The following lists events in the year 2018 in Gabon.

Incumbents
 President: Ali Bongo Ondimba
 Prime Minister: Emmanuel Issoze-Ngondet

Events

October
 October 6 - Gabonese voters head to the polls for a legislative election, the first election since the controversial presidential election in 2016.

Deaths

1 January – Régis Manon, footballer (b. 1965).
26 March – Jules-Aristide Bourdes-Ogouliguende, politician (b. 1938).

References

 
2010s in Gabon
Years of the 21st century in Gabon
Gabon
Gabon